Šatrinci (Serbian Cyrillic: Шатринци, Hungarian: Satrinca) is a village in Serbia. It is located in the Irig municipality, in the Srem District, Vojvodina province. The village has a Hungarian ethnic majority and its population numbering 399 people (2002 census).

Name
The name of the village in Serbian is plural.

Historical population

1961: 810
1971: 593
1981: 395
1991: 400

See also
List of places in Serbia
List of cities, towns and villages in Vojvodina

References
Slobodan Ćurčić, Broj stanovnika Vojvodine, Novi Sad, 1996.

External links

History of Satrinci

Populated places in Syrmia